The 1972 Penn Quakers football team represented the University of Pennsylvania in the 1972 NCAA University Division football season.

Schedule

Roster

References

Penn
Penn Quakers football seasons
Penn Quakers football